Golod is a Russian surname and means hunger, it may refer to 
Evgeny Golod (1935–2018), mathematician
Golod–Shafarevich theorem
Vitali Golod (born 1971), chess player
Alexander Golod, Ukrainian defense contractor, current scientist, and alternative healer